Randulf of Evesham was a medieval Bishop of Worcester-elect and Abbot of Evesham.

Life

Randulf was a monk of Evesham Abbey before becoming Prior of Worcester on 24 December 1204. On 2 December 1213 he was elected to the see of Worcester but his election was quashed by the papal legate for England, Niccolò de Romanis, cardinal bishop of Tusculum, sometime before 20 January 1214 when Randulf was elected Abbot of Evesham.

Randulf was elected as abbot on 22 January 1214, and was blessed by the papal legate at St Mary's, York on 10 March 1214. He died 17 December 1229.

Citations

References
 British History Online Bishops of Worcester accessed on 3 November 2007
 British History Online Priors of Worcester accessed on 3 November 2007
 

Bishops of Worcester
Priors of Worcester
Abbots of Evesham
13th-century English Roman Catholic bishops
1229 deaths
Year of birth unknown